Frank Davies may refer to:
Frank Davies (rugby league), rugby league footballer who played in the 1960s and 1970s
Frank Davies (footballer, born 1903) (1903–1970), Welsh footballer
Frank Davies (footballer, born 1910) (1910–1989), Australian rules footballer for South Melbourne
Frank Davies (footballer, born 1907) (1907–1993), Australian rules footballer for South Melbourne
Frank Davies (record producer) (born 1946), Canadian record producer

See also
Frank Davis (disambiguation)
Franklin Davies (disambiguation)
Francis Davies (disambiguation)